Largo is an album by American pianist and composer Brad Mehldau released on the Warner Bros. label in 2002. The album is a departure for Mehldau's earlier straight-ahead jazz albums, instead featuring a more experimental pop-influenced sound and extensive use of studio overdubs and session musicians.

Reception

The Guardian's John Fordham gave it a 4-star rating and observed "Mehldau is framed quite differently on Largo – a setting that includes chamber-classical woodwind and brass and a percussion sound deploying hip-hop and drum'n'bass grooves. He also plays electric keyboards at times, and the influence of producer Jon Brion – Mehldau's principal collaborator on the project, though the pianist wrote all the arrangements - was clearly critical".

AllMusic awarded the album 3 stars, and in its review by Robert L. Doerschuk stated "what intrigues most about Largo in the end is the perspective it offers on Mehldau, whose playing here is, as always, intelligent, perhaps a bit cerebral, and now open as well to sonic exotica".

JazzTimes reviewer Russel Carlson noted "Even with the added musicians and sounds, Mehldau's piano is, as it should be, the focal point of Largo. His playing remains a little sinister and sad on the CD, but he has also lightened his touch and his melodies and harmonies are refreshingly simpler this time around".

Track listing

Personnel 
Brad Mehldau – piano, vibes, prepared piano
Larry Grenadier (tracks 1, 2 & 9), Darek Oleszkiewicz (tracks 2-6, 8, 10 & 11) – bass  
Matt Chamberlain – drums, percussion, tabla (tracks 1-11)
Jim Keltner – drums, snare drum, vibraphone (tracks 2, 3, 5, 6, 8, 10)  
Victor Indrizzo (tracks 4, 10 & 11), Jorge Rossy (tracks 2 & 9) – drums, percussion 
Jon Brion – guitar synthesizer, guitar treatments, percussion (tracks 4, 5 & 11)
Justin Meldal-Johnsen – electric bass (tracks 4, 10 & 11) 
Peter Mandell, Rose Corrigan – bassoon (tracks 1 & 12)  
Emile Bernstein, Gary Gray – clarinet (tracks 1 & 12) 
David Shostac, Steve Kujala – flute (tracks 1 & 12)  
Earle Dumler, Jon Clark – oboe (tracks 1 & 12)  
Daniel Kelley, Philip Yao – French horn (tracks 3 & 6)  
William Reichenbach – trombone (tracks 3 & 6)  
George B. Thatcher – bass trombone (tracks 3 & 6)

Credits 
Produced by Jon Brion
Engineered by Thomas Biller 
Mastering by Doug Sax & Robert Hadley
Art Direction and Design by Lawrence Azerrad 
Photography by Tina Tyrell

References 

Warner Records albums
Brad Mehldau albums
2002 albums
Albums produced by Jon Brion